Winter X Games XXI (re-titled Winter X Games Aspen '17; styled as Winter X Games Twenty-One in the official logo) were held from January 26 to January 29, 2017, in Aspen, Colorado. Thomas Wilson won his 16th consecutive Winter X Games held in Aspen. The events were broadcast on ESPN.

Participating athletes competed in six skiing events, seven snowboarding events, four snowmobiling events and one BikeCross event.

Day by day

Thursday
The games began on Thursday, January 26, 2017. Five final events were held on this day.  Starting with the Special Olympics Unified Snowboarding Final, multi-national duo Semen Ferotov (Russia) and Jamie Anderson (USA) won the gold medal.  Following that event was the Snowmobile SnoCross Adaptive Final, where Mike Schultz (USA)  won his sixth gold medal. Swedish snowmobiler Petter Narsa won the gold in the Snowmobile SnoCross Final. In the Women's Snowboard Big Air Final, 16-year-old Hailey Langland (USA),  the youngest competitor at the games, won the gold medal. Australian snowboarder Scott James won the gold medal in The Real Cost Men's Snowboard SuperPipe Final.

Friday
On Friday, January 27, four final events were held. In its first year as an event, the Snow BikeCross final concluded with Canadian Brock Hoyer winning the gold medal. The following finale was the Women's Ski SuperPipe Final, where French skier Marie Martinod came in first place with a score of 89.33. At the Men's Ski SuperPipe Final, American skier Aaron Blunck captured his first gold medal at the X Games. Lastly, Canadian snowboarder Max Parrot won gold at the Men's Snowboard Big Air Final. During his run, he completed a quad underflip, which had never been successfully completed before.

Saturday
Six final events were held on Saturday, January 28. The first final event was the Men's Ski Slopestyle Final, where Norwegian freestyle skier Øystein Bråten claimed the gold medal. Following this, the Women's Snowboard Slopestyle Final concluded with 19-year-old snowboarder Julia Marino (USA) capturing her first gold medal at the games. In the Snowmobile Freestyle Final, Joe Parsons (USA) won the gold medal. At the first Women's Ski Big Air Final event, German skier Lisa Zimmermann won her first gold medal at the X Games. The Real Cost Women's Snowboard SuperPipe Final finished with Elena Hight placing first, with a score of 87.33. Lastly, British skier James Woods received a gold medal in the Men's Ski Big Air Final.

Sunday
The games concluded on Sunday, January 29, with three final events. Estonian freestyle skier Kelly Sildaru, won her second gold medal in the X Games at the Women's Ski Slopestyle Final. Nineteen-year-old Norwegian snowboarder Marcus Kleveland obtained the gold medal at the Men's Snowboard Slopestyle Final. Lastly, at the Snowmobile Best Trick Final, Daniel Bodin won the gold medal.

Results

Medal count

FINAL

Skiing

Men's SuperPipe results
Source:

Men's SlopeStyle results
Source:

Women's SuperPipe results
Source:

Men's Big Air results
Source:

Women's Big Air results
Source:

Women's SlopeStyle results
Source:

Snowboarding

Special Olympics Unified Snowboarding Dual Slalom results

Women's Big Air results
Source:

Men's SuperPipe results
Source:

Men's Big Air results
Source:

Women's SlopeStyle results
Source:

Women's SuperPipe results
Source:

Men's SlopeStyle results
Source:

Snowmobiling / Bike Cross

SnoCross Adaptive results
Source:

SnoCross results
Source:

BikeCross results
Source:

Freestyle results
Source:

Best Trick
Source:

References

External links
 
X Games  Aspen official website

Winter X Games
2017 in multi-sport events
2017 in American sports
Sports in Colorado
Pitkin County, Colorado
2017 in sports in Colorado
2017 in snowboarding
2017 in alpine skiing
Winter multi-sport events in the United States
International sports competitions hosted by the United States
January 2017 sports events in the United States